Mureș County is a county (județ) of Romania, in the historical region of Transylvania, with the administrative centre in Târgu Mureș. The county was established in 1968, after the administrative reorganization that re-introduced the historical judeţ (county) system, still used today. This reform eliminated the previous Mureș-Magyar Autonomous Region, which had been created in 1952 within the People's Republic of Romania. Mureș County has a vibrant multicultural fabric that includes Hungarian-speaking Székelys and Transylvanian Saxons, with a rich heritage of fortified churches and towns.

Name
In Hungarian, it is known as Maros megye, and in German as Kreis Mieresch. Under Kingdom of Hungary, a county with an similar name (Maros-Torda County) was created in 1876. There was a county with the same name under the Kingdom of Romania, and a Mureș-Magyar Autonomous Region (1960–1968) under the Socialist Republic of Romania.

Geography

The northeastern side of the county consists of the Călimani and Gurghiu Mountains and the sub-Carpathian hills, members of the Inner Eastern Carpathians. The rest of the county is part of the Transylvanian Plateau, with deep but wide valleys.

The main river crossing in the county is the Mureș River. The Târnava Mare River and the Târnava Mică River also cross the county.

Mureș County is bordered by seven other counties: Suceava, Harghita, Brașov, Sibiu, Alba, Cluj and Bistrița-Năsăud.

Neighbours

 Harghita County in the East.
 Alba County and Cluj County in the West.
 Bistrița-Năsăud County and Suceava County in the North.
 Sibiu County and Brașov County in the South.

Demographics 

In terms of religion:

 Romanian Orthodox –  53.3%
 Reformed Church – 27%
 Roman Catholic Church – 9.5%
 Other Christian denominations – 8.2%
 Jewish, Muslim, Atheist, Non-religious, other, or undeclared – 1.9%

Tourism
Some of the main tourist attractions in the county are:
 The old city of Târgu Mureș
 The medieval city of Sighișoara
 Sovata resort
 The city of Reghin
 The medieval fortified church of Saschiz 
 Călimani Mountains – Gurghiu Mountains

Media

TV stations 

The only cable provider in Târgu-Mureș is RCS&RDS, in Reghin is Gliga CATV, and in Sighișoara Teleson .

Radio stations

Târgu-Mureș stations

Print

Newspapers and magazines 
 Cuvântul Liber
 Zi de Zi
 Ziarul de Mureș
 Népújság
 Krónika
 Vásárhelyi Hírlap

Economy
The predominant industries in the county are:
 Wood industry.
 Food industry.
 Textile industry.
 Glass and ceramics industry.
 Construction materials.
 Musical instruments (Reghin).

Mureș County and Sibiu County together produce about 50% of the natural gas developed in Romania. Salt is also extracted in the county.

Politics 

The Mureș County Council, renewed at the 2020 local elections, consists of 34 counsellors, with the following party composition:

Administrative divisions 

Mureș County has 4 municipalities, 7 towns and 91 communes.

 Municipalities
 Târgu Mureș – county seat; population: 134,290 (as of 2011)
 Reghin
 Sighișoara
 Târnăveni
 Towns
 Iernut
 Luduș
 Miercurea Nirajului
 Sângeorgiu de Pădure
 Sărmașu
 Sovata
 Ungheni

 Communes
 Acățari
 Adămuș
 Albești
 Aluniș
 Apold
 Ațintiș
 Bahnea
 Band
 Batoș
 Băgaciu
 Băla
 Bălăușeri
 Beica de Jos
 Bereni
 Bichiș
 Bogata
 Brâncovenești
 Breaza
 Ceuașu de Câmpie
 Chețani
 Chibed
 Chiheru de Jos
 Coroisânmărtin
 Corunca
 Cozma
 Crăciunești
 Cucerdea
 Crăiești
 Cristești
 Cuci
 Daneș
 Deda
 Eremitu
 Ernei
 Fântânele
 Fărăgău
 Gălești
 Gănești
 Gheorghe Doja
 Ghindari
 Glodeni
 Gornești
 Grebenișu de Câmpie
 Gurghiu
 Hodac
 Hodoșa
 Ibănești
 Iclănzel
 Ideciu de Jos
 Livezeni
 Lunca
 Lunca Bradului
 Mădăraș
 Măgherani
 Mica
 Miheșu de Câmpie
 Nadeș
 Neaua
 Ogra
 Papiu Ilarian
 Pănet
 Păsăreni
 Petelea
 Pogăceaua
 Râciu
 Răstolița
 Rușii-Munți
 Sâncraiu de Mureș
 Sângeorgiu de Mureș
 Sânger
 Sânpaul
 Sânpetru de Câmpie
 Sântana de Mureș
 Sărățeni
 Saschiz
 Solovăstru
 Stânceni
 Suplac
 Suseni
 Șăulia
 Șincai
 Tăureni
 Valea Largă
 Vânători
 Vărgata
 Vătava
 Vețca
 Viișoara
 Voivodeni
 Zagăr
 Zau de Câmpie

Historical county

Historically, Mureş-Turda County was located in the central-northern part of Greater Romania, in the central part of Transylvania. The capital was Târgu Mureș. After the administrative unification law in 1925, it was renamed to Mureș County, and the territory was reorganized. It was bordered on the south by Târnava-Mică County, on the southwest by Turda County, on the west by Cluj County, on the north by Năsăud County, on the northeast with the counties of Câmpulung and Neamț, and on the southeast with the counties of Ciuc and Odorhei. Most of the territory of the historical county is found in the present Mureș County, except for the northeastern area, which is located in Harghita County, and the northwestern area in Bistrița-Năsăud County today.

History
Prior to World War I, the territory of the county belonged to Austria-Hungary and identical with the Maros-Torda County of the Kingdom of Hungary. The territory of Mureș County was transferred to Romania from Hungary as successor state to Austria-Hungary in 1920 under the Treaty of Trianon.

In 1938, King Carol II promulgated a new Constitution, and subsequently he had the administrative division of the Romanian territory changed. 10 ținuturi (approximate translation: "lands") were created (by merging the counties) to be ruled by rezidenți regali (approximate translation: "Royal Residents") – appointed directly by the King – instead of the prefects. Mureș County became part of Ținutul Mureș.

In 1940, the county was transferred back to Hungary with the rest of Northern Transylvania under the Second Vienna Award. Beginning in 1944, Romanian forces with Soviet assistance recaptured the ceded territory and reintegrated it into Romania, re-establishing the county. Romanian jurisdiction over the entire county per the Treaty of Trianon was reaffirmed in the Paris Peace Treaties, 1947. The county was disestablished by the communist government of Romania in 1950, and re-established in 1968 when Romania restored the county administrative system.

Administration

The county originally consisted of seven districts (plăși):
Plasa Band, headquartered at Band
Plasa Miercurea Nirajului, headquartered at Miercurea Nirajului
Plasa Râciu, headquartered at Râciu
Plasa Reghin, headquartered at Reghin
Plasa Târgu Mureș (also called Plasa Mureș), headquartered at Târgu Mureș
Plasa Teaca, headquartered at Teaca
Plasa Toplița, headquartered at Toplița

A subsequent administrative adjustment added one district, divided Plasa Mureș into two, and divided Plasa Reghin into two, leaving ten districts:
Plasa Band, headquartered at Band
Plasa Gurhiu, headquartered at Gurghiu
Plasa Miercurea Nirajului, headquartered at Miercurea Nirajului
Plasa Mureș de Jos, headquartered at Mureșeni
Plasa Mureș de Sus, headquartered at Târgu Mureș
Plasa Râciu, headquartered at Râciu
Plasa Reghin de Jos, headquartered at Reghin
Plasa Reghin de Sus, headquartered at Suseni
Plasa Teaca, headquartered at Teaca
Plasa Toplița, headquartered at Toplița

The county had two urban localities: Târgu Mureş (a city) and Reghin (urban commune).

Population 
According to the census data of 1930, the county's population was 289,546, of which 45.8% were Romanians, 42.6% Hungarians, 3.9% Germans, 3.9% Romanies, 3.4% Jews, as well as other minorities. By mother tongue, the county population consisted of 45.9% Hungarian speakers, 45.5% Romanian speakers, 3.9% German speakers, 2.2% Yiddish speakers, and 2.1% Romany speakers. In the religious aspect, the population consisted of 32.4% Greek Catholic, 30.3% Reformed, 14.5% Eastern Orthodox, 12.1% Roman Catholic, 3.9% Lutheran, 3.6% Jewish, 2.6% Unitarian, as well as other minorities.

Urban population 
In 1930, the urban population of the county was 47,807, of which 54.3% were Hungarians, 24.3% Romanians, 13.4% Jews, 6.0% Germans, 1.1% Romanies, as well as other minorities. As a mother tongue in the urban population, Hungarian was spoken by 61.2% of the population, followed by Romanian, spoken by 23.6% of the population as mother tongue, Yiddish (7.4%) and German (6.2%).  From the religious point of view, the urban population was made up of 32.6% Reformed, 20.1% Roman Catholic, 14.2% Greek Catholic, 14.2% Jewish, 10% Eastern Orthodox, 5.9% Lutheran, 2.3% Unitarian, as well as other minorities.

References

External links 
  Euro Maros
  Mediatica News
  Mureş Info
  Mureş online

Media
TVR Mures
Cuvântul Liber
 Zi-de-zi.ro
www.e-nepujsag.ro
Krónika
Székelyhon
Digi24 Cluj-Napoca

 
Counties of Romania
Hungarian communities in Romania
Geography of Transylvania
1925 establishments in Romania
1938 disestablishments in Romania
1944 establishments in Romania
1950 disestablishments in Romania
1968 establishments in Romania
States and territories established in 1925
States and territories disestablished in 1938
States and territories established in 1944
States and territories disestablished in 1950
States and territories established in 1968